Maharaj Adhirajkumar Chandrarup Shah was the youngest son of Prithvipati Shah and Rani Kulangavati. He is known in the history of Nepal for cleverly settling power struggle in the Royal house of Gorkha between Dal Shah and Udyot Shah after the death of their older brother (Crown Prince) Birbhadra Shah. Chandrarup Shah was appointed as the  Regent for his nephew Maharaj Nara Bhupal Shah

Death of Yuvaraj Birbhadra Shah 

Birdbhadra Shah was the eldest son of Prithvipati Shah. He married the daughter of the Raja of Tanhun. She was pregnant, with only Birbhadra Shah knowing this. Chandrarup Shah, Birdbhadra's younger brother, said to him, "Great intimacy has existed between us from our boyhood, and I wish to open my bosom to you alone. My disease seems a serious one, and I have no hope of recovery. My rani is pregnant and has gone to her father's house. If anything happens to me by God's pleasure, you will make inquiries as to the result of her pregnancy, and give her your support." Birdbhadra replied that he would carry out his desires to the utmost of his power, life and wealth, and assuring him that nothing would go amiss in his household, comforted him, and told him not to think about it. Following Birbhadra's death, Chandrarup privately ascertained that the deceased's rani had given birth to Nara Bhupal Shah in Tanahun.

Maharaj Narabhupal Shah 

 
Maharaj Prithwipati Shah ruled Gorkha from 1673 - 1716 A.D. He was highly impressed by Malla art and architecture during his visit to Kathmandu, he constructed temples of goddess Kali, Lord Pashupati, Hanuman (Monkey god) and foot prints of sage Gorakhnath from whom Gorkha derived its name. The image of Pashupati and hanuman are exactly the same as that of Kathmandu valleys. The temple of Goddess Manakamana was also constructed by him.
 
Maharaj Prithiwipati,  being very old began to consider as to the selection of a successor. He reflected that his eldest son had been taken away by God, and had left no heir. He could not give the gaddi to his second son, Dal Shah, as he was excluded by having only one eye. If he gave it to the third, Udyot Shah, it would appear unjust to put a younger son on the gaddi to the prejudice of an elder claimant. His council was divided in its choice. Some were in favor of the second, and others of the third son, and they could not determine to whom to give gaddi. Chandrarup Shah now presented himself to the Raja at a private audience, and said that all the sons of raja could not succeed their father, and the practice heretofore, observed, should still be followed.

Prithwipati hereupon asked him to explain himself, and he then related all the particulars as to the rani of Birbhadra Shah having been pregnant, and having given birth to Nara Bhupal Shah. The Raja was glad to hear this, but was still full of doubt. Chandrarup Shah sent a messenger to fetch Narbhupal Shah, but the Raja of Tanhun, thinking that, by mean of this child, the sovereignty of Gorkha might fall into his own hands, refused to send him. Chandrarup Shah then bribed the nurse and attendants of Narbhupal Shah, and by their help he succeeded in having him brought to his own house in Gorkha, where he kept him carefully for three years. In the beginning of the fourth year, he one day sent him on the back of a slave into the presence of the Raja, who inquired who the boy was, but on being told by the slave that it was the Sahib ji (heir apparent), he said nothing. One day Nara Bhupal Shah was swimming naked and his whole body being exposed to the Raja's view, he exclaimed that he was an incarnation of Birbhadra Shah, and carrying him off to the Durbar, he seated himself on the gaddi with his grandson on his lap.

He then called Chandrarup Shah, and praised him for his endeavours to restore his lost descendant. Giving him a pat on the back, he exclaimed : Syabas! You have done your duty to the utmost. My descendants will hereforth regards yours as their own brothers. Your jagirs and birtas will descent to your posterity rent free"

After the death of Prithwi-pati, for the succession of Narbhupal Shah, there was much intrigue but because of the loyalty of Chandra Rup Shah and courtiers, he became the king without bloodshed. To him was born Prithvi Narayan Shah. Prithvi Narayan Shah took his seat on the gaddi, at the age of twelve, in Saka 1644 (1742 A.D.)

Descendants 

Chandrarup Shah had two sons: Vishnurup Shah and Birbaha Shah. Vishburup Shah had only one son: Jiv Shah. Jiv Shah had three sons: Sri Chautaria Prana Shah (Granted the title of Sri Chautaria 1803), Shamsher Shah, and General H.E. Sri Chautariya Pushkar Shah.

General H.E. Sri Chautaria Pushkar Shah was born in 1784, educated privately. He served as the Governor of Doti 1831-1837, as a Special Ambassador to China 1837-1838, as Mukhtiyar (Prime Minister) 1838-1839, and as Councilor of State 1840-1843. He died in 1841. He has four sons: Sri Chautaria Bhim Bikram Shah, Rana Bikram Shah, Colonel Sri Chautaria Bir Bikram Shah, and Colonel Ambar Bikram Shah.

Colonel Ambar Bikram Shah was killed by the Ranas for his part in the attempted coup d'état, at Teku, January 1882. His son Jabber Jung escaped from Kathmandu disguised as a Jogi with his son Amar Jung Shah Shah to a village. Jabbar Jung's mission was to organize an army to topple the regime of Ranodeep Singh Kunwar. Jabbar's daughter was married to Maharaj Bhim Shumsher Jung Bahadur Rana. She gave birth to Maharaj Padma Shumsher.

References 

Nepalese royalty
17th-century Nepalese people
Shah dynasty